Frankie McAvoy (born 9 July 1967) is a Scottish professional football manager and coach who is currently Academy Director at Scottish Premiership club Heart of Midlothian.

McAvoy was previously the head coach at  club Preston North End.

Playing career
McAvoy did not play football at a professional level, instead playing junior football locally for Bellshill Athletic, Thorniewood United, Wishaw, Bellshill YM and Blantyre Victoria.

Coaching career
In 2003, McAvoy joined Dunfermline Athletic as an academy coach. In 2005, McAvoy joined Hamilton Academical in the same role, later becoming academy director. In 2013, following Alex Neil's appointment as manager, McAvoy became first team coach at Hamilton. In 2015, both McAvoy and Neil moved to Norwich City, with McAvoy once again acting as first team coach. In July 2017, the pair moved to EFL Championship club Preston North End.

Following the dismissal of Neil on 21 March 2021, McAvoy was named as interim head coach of Preston until the end of the 2020–21 season. On 10 May 2021, McAvoy appointed head coach permanently, after winning five of his eight matches in interim charges.

On 6 December 2021, McAvoy was dismissed by Preston after winning just six league games out of 21 in the 2021–22 season.

On 3 February 2022, McAvoy joined Scottish Premiership side Heart of Midlothian as Academy Director, being given "a wide-ranging remit to oversee the youth system".

Managerial statistics

References

1967 births
Living people
Scottish footballers
Scottish football managers
Preston North End F.C. managers
English Football League managers
Bellshill Athletic F.C. players
Thorniewood United F.C. players
Wishaw F.C. players
Blantyre Victoria F.C. players
Association football coaches
Dunfermline Athletic F.C. non-playing staff
Hamilton Academical F.C. non-playing staff
Norwich City F.C. non-playing staff
Preston North End F.C. non-playing staff
Association footballers not categorized by position
Heart of Midlothian F.C. non-playing staff